The 2014 Firestone 600K was the eighth round of the 2014 IndyCar Series season. It took place on Saturday, June 7. The race was contested over 248 laps at the  Texas Motor Speedway in Fort Worth, Texas, and was televised by NBCSN in the United States. The race was won by Ed Carpenter.

Classification

Notes

 Points include 1 point for leading at least 1 lap during a race, an additional 2 points for leading the most race laps, and 1 point for pole position.

References

External links

Firestone 600
Firestone 600
2014 Firestone 600
June 2014 sports events in the United States